This is a list of the Egypt national football team results from 2000 to 2019.

2000s

2000

2001

2002

2003

2004

2005

2006

2007

2008

2009

2010s

2010

2011

2012

2013

2014

2015

2016

2017

2018

2019

Head-to-head records

References

2000s
2000s in Egypt
2010s in Egypt